The men's 1500 metre freestyle at the 2005 World Aquatics Championships occurred on the morning of 30 July (heats) and in the evening of 31 July (final) in the Olympic pool at Parc Jean-Drapeau in Montreal, Canada. 34 swimmers were entered in the event, of which 33 swam.

The existing records at the start of the event were:
World record (WR): 14:34.56, Grant Hackett (Australia), July 21, 2001 in Fukuoka, Japan.
Championship record (CR): same

Results

Final

Heats
The top-8 swimmers from the 5 preliminary heats qualified for the event final, the next evening. These eight "qualifiers" are denoted by a Q.

See also
Swimming at the 2003 World Aquatics Championships – Men's 1500 metre freestyle
Swimming at the 2004 Summer Olympics – Men's 1500 metre freestyle
Swimming at the 2007 World Aquatics Championships – Men's 1500 metre freestyle

References

FINA Worlds 2005: Men's 1500 Freestyle heats results from OmegaTiming.com (official timer of the 2005 Worlds). Published 2005-07-30, retrieved 2009-08-21.
FINA Worlds 2005: Men's 1500 Freestyle final results from OmegaTiming.com (official timer of the 2005 Worlds). Published 2005-07-30, retrieved 2009-08-21.

Swimming at the 2005 World Aquatics Championships